Juan Antonio Catafau Vignes (born 19 April 1951) is a Chilean former footballer who played as a right winger for clubs in Chile and Spain.

Career
A winger from the Colchagua youth system, Catafau made his debut in 1970 in the Chilean Segunda División. In 1971, he switched to Green Cross-Temuco until 1973, becoming a well remembered player of the team.

In 1974, he played for Unión Española in the Copa Libertadores. After a tour through Spain with them following the FIFA World Cup and taking part in the La Línea de Concepción Tournament, he joined Valencia, becoming the second Chilean to play for the club after Higinio Ortúzar. After having no chances to make appearances in the league with the first team, he was loaned to CD Mestalla, getting promotion to the Spanish Tercera División in the 1976–77 season. In total, he made 9 appearances and scored one goal for Valencia in both friendlies and matches at regional level before switching to Getafe Deportivo for the 1977–78 season, where he made 9 appearances in the Spanish Segunda División.

In 1978, he returned to Chile and joined Palestino for two months. Next he played for Green Cross-Temuco, Deportes Concepción and Rangers de Talca in the top division.

His last club was Ñublense in 1984 in the Chilean Tercera División.

Personal life
Catafau was born in Santiago, Chile, to a Catalan father from Sentmenat.

At the beginning of his stint in Valencia, he lived with his compatriot Carlos Caszely, a player of Levante UD at the time.

He was nicknamed Cata, a short form of Catafau.

References

External links
 
 Juan Catafau at PlaymakerStats.com
 Juan Catafau at BDFutbol.com 
 Juan Catafau at Ciberche.net 

1951 births
Living people
Chilean people of Catalan descent
Chilean people of Spanish descent
Sportspeople of Spanish descent
Footballers from Santiago
Chilean footballers
Chilean expatriate footballers
Deportes Colchagua footballers
Deportes Temuco footballers
Unión Española footballers
Valencia CF players
Valencia CF Mestalla footballers
Getafe CF footballers
Club Deportivo Palestino footballers
Deportes Concepción (Chile) footballers
Rangers de Talca footballers
Ñublense footballers
Primera B de Chile players
Chilean Primera División players
La Liga players
Tercera División players
Segunda División players
Tercera División de Chile players
Chilean expatriate sportspeople in Spain
Expatriate footballers in Spain
Association football forwards